Ronald Koone Sebego is a member of the Pan-African Parliament from Botswana and the National Assembly of Botswana. He is also a member of the Botswana Democratic Party.

References

Year of birth missing (living people)
Living people
Members of the National Assembly (Botswana)
Members of the Pan-African Parliament from Botswana
Botswana Democratic Party politicians